This Is for Real is an album released in June 2004 by band Pink Grease.

Track listing 
"Remember Forever"
"Fever"
"The Pink G.R. Ease"
"Emotional Retard"
"Wind Up Bird"
"Peaches"
"Nasty Show, The"
"Superfool"
"Party Live"
"Serial Heartbreaker"
"High Strung Chironi"
"Into My Heart"

References

2004 albums
Pink Grease albums